The Monte Zeda is a mountain in the Lepontine Alps belonging to the Province of Verbano-Cusio-Ossola (Italy).

Geography 
The mountain is located in Piedmont (Provincia del Verbano-Cusio-Ossola), between two Alpine valleys: Val Grande and Val Cannobina. Its summit is a tripoint at which the borders of the municipalities of Miazzina, Aurano and Valle Cannobina meet. Along with Cima della Laurasca is the highest summit of the surrounding area. On the summit, which offers a very wide view on the surrounding mountain, stands a cross bearing a box sheltering a summit register.

SOIUSA classification 
According to SOIUSA (International Standardized Mountain Subdivision of the Alps) the mountain can be classified in the following way:
 main part = Western Alps
 major sector = North Western Alps
 section = Lepontine Alps
 subsection = South-western Lepontine Alps ( Alpi Ticinesi e del Verbano)
 supergroup = Catena Togano-Laurasca-Limidario
 group = Gruppo Zeda-Laurasca
 subgroup = Gruppo dello Zeda
 code = I/B-10.II-C.7.b

Access to the summit 

Reaching the summit of Monte Zeda does not require alpinistic skill. It can be accessed starting from Premeno through Alpe Manegra, Piancavallo and, later, "Passo Folungo" (a mountain pass at 1,369 m) and Alpe Archia. Another route to Monte Zeda starts from Falmenta and takes about 5 hours walking.

Nature conservation 

The Southern and Western slopes of the mountain are included in the Val Grande National Park.

Mountain huts 
  Rifugio Pian Cavallone

References

Maps
 Italian official cartography (Istituto Geografico Militare - IGM); on-line version: www.pcn.minambiente.it
 Istituto Geografico Centrale - Carta dei sentieri e dei rifugi scala 1:50.000 n. 12 Laghi Maggiore, d'Orta e di Varese

External links 
 

Two-thousanders of Italy
Mountains of Piedmont
Mountains of the Alps
Province of Verbano-Cusio-Ossola
Lepontine Alps